Abraham Iverson, shown in some records, including land patents, as Abraham Iveson was a member of the Virginia House of Burgesses, the elected lower house of the colonial Virginia General Assembly, from Gloucester County, in 1653.

On October 17, 1636, James Vanerit acquired 1,000 acres of land in Elizabeth City County, Virginia, now Norfolk, Virginia, from one Stafferton. Stafferton was owed the land for providing the transportation of 20 colonists, including "Abr. Iveson" to Virginia.

A bill of lading of Joseph Clifton, a London merchant shows goods conveyed on the Tristan & Jane of London, April 26, 1637, to "Abraham Iveson, planter", among others.

"Mr. Abraham Iveson" acquired 655 acres of land on the southwest side of the North River in "Mockjack" (or Mobjack) Bay in Gloucester County in a patent dated June 10, 1651.

Notes

References

 Nugent, Nell Marion. 'Cavaliers and Pioneers: 1666-1695'. Richmond: Virginia State Library, 1977. . Retrieved March 6, 2013.
 Stanard, William G. and Mary Newton Stanard. The Virginia Colonial Register. Albany, NY: Joel Munsell's Sons Publishers, 1902. , Retrieved July 15, 2011.
 Tepper, Michael, ed. New World Immigrants: A Consolidation of Ship Passenger Lists and Associated Data from Periodical Literature. Baltimore: Genealogical Publishing Com, 1979. .
 Tyler, Lyon Gardiner, ed. 'Encyclopedia of Virginia Biography'. Volume 1. New York, Lewis Historical Publishing Company, 1915. . Retrieved February 16, 2013.

People from Gloucester County, Virginia
Virginia colonial people
House of Burgesses members